Mateusz Oszmaniec (born 19 July 1988) is a Polish former footballer who played as a goalkeeper.

Career

In 2008, Oszmaniec signed for Polish fourth tier side Bytovia Bytów, where he made 144 league appearances and scored 0 goals, helping them earn promotion to the Polish fourth tier to the Polish second tier within 6 seasons.

References

External links
 

1988 births
Association football goalkeepers
Bytovia Bytów players
I liga players
II liga players
III liga players
People from Lębork
Polish footballers
Living people